Doblemente embarazada is a 2019 Mexican comedy film directed by Koko Stambuk. The film premiered on 20 December 2019. It stars Maite Perroni, who serves as executive producer. Additionally, Perroni shares credits with Matías Novoa, Gustavo Egelhaaf, and Verónica Jaspeado. The plot revolves around Cristina, who discovered she is pregnant a few days before her wedding; Happiness disappears after realizing she doesn't know who is the dad. This is due to a crazy encounter with her ex-boyfriend during the bachelorette party.

Plot 
Cristina (Maite Perroni) is about to marry Javier (Gustavo Egelhaaf). One night, her friend (Verónica Jaspeado) takes her to celebrate her bachelorette party, where she has an unexpected encounter with her former lover in life. Within weeks, Cristina learns that she is pregnant, and does not know if the father is from her future husband Javier, or Felipe (Matías Novoa). Surprises increase when, in the fourth month of pregnancy, the doctor tells Cristina the results of the paternity test.

Cast 
 Maite Perroni as Cristina
 Matías Novoa as Felipe
 Gustavo Egelhaaf as Javier
 Verónica Jaspeado as Catalina

See also 
 Doblemente embarazada (2021 film) (a Peruvian remake)

References

External links 
 
2019 comedy films
Mexican comedy films
Tondero Producciones films
2010s Mexican films

2010s Spanish-language films